Cricket made its debut at the 16th Asian Games 2010 at Guanggong International Cricket Stadium, Guangzhou, China where it was one of 42 sports competed in. The matches were played in Twenty20 format.

Both Men's and Women's tournaments were conducted. In the men's event host nation China, were joined by three of the four ICC Full Members in Asia: Bangladesh, Pakistan and Sri Lanka as well as Afghanistan who played in the 2010 ICC World Twenty20.

Due to other international commitments, Sri Lanka, Bangladesh and Pakistan fielded understrength teams whilst India did not participate. Bangladesh defeated Afghanistan in the final event to win the gold medal while the latter won the silver. The bronze went to Pakistan after they beat Sri Lanka in the third-place match.

In the women's event China played with ICC Women's Cricket Full Member Pakistan. India and Sri Lanka did not participate.
Pakistan won its first cricket gold in women's event while Bangladesh gained a silver.
Japan defeated China in the bronze medal match, in what could be a boost for cricket in Japan.

Schedule

Medalists

Medal table

Draw

Men
The three Test-playing countries and Afghanistan (who played in the 2010 ICC World Twenty20) were seeded and went directly to the knock-out stage.

Pool C

*

Pool D

* Withdrew

Quarterfinals
 vs. 2nd Pool D
 vs. 2nd Pool C
 vs. 1st Pool C
 vs. 1st Pool D

Women

Pool A

Pool B

Final standing

Men

Women

References
Cricket Officially added for Asia 2010

External links
Official website:cricket (English)
Official Website:cricket (Chinese)

 
International cricket competitions in China
A
2010 Asian Games events
2010